Giuseppe Peruchetti (30 October 1907 – 1995) was an Italian professional football player and coach who played as a goalkeeper.

Honours
Inter
 Serie A champion: 1937–38, 1939–40.
 Coppa Italia winner: 1938–39.

Juventus
 Coppa Italia winner: 1941–42.

External links
 Career summary by playerhistory.com
 

1907 births
1995 deaths
Italian footballers
Italy international footballers
Serie A players
Brescia Calcio players
Inter Milan players
Juventus F.C. players
Italian football managers
Inter Milan managers
Association football goalkeepers